Famienkro is a town in east-central Ivory Coast. It is a sub-prefecture of Prikro Department in Iffou Region, Lacs District.

Famienkro was a commune until March 2012, when it became one of 1126 communes nationwide that were abolished.

In 2014, the population of the sub-prefecture of Famienkro was 11,217.

Villages
The  13 villages of the sub-prefecture of Famienkro and their population in 2014 are:

References

Sub-prefectures of Iffou
Former communes of Ivory Coast